Mercier–Hochelaga-Maisonneuve is a borough of Montreal, Quebec, Canada located in the southeastern end of the island.

History
See Mercier and Hochelaga-Maisonneuve articles for a more detailed histories of respective areas

Hochelaga was founded as a village in 1870, and annexed to Montreal in 1883. In response, dissatisfied landowners founded the village of Maisonneuve to the east.

Maisonneuve grew rapidly and became known as the Pittsburgh of Canada for its heavy industry, before finally being annexed to Montreal in 1918.

These factories hired many workers, including immigrants and people from the surrounding countryside. They worked in the shoe, textile, tanning, slaughterhouse, tobacco, food, and shipbuilding industries.

In 1920, many factories closed and moved east to Mercier. Mercier was an agglomeration of old villages: Beau-Rivage, Longue-Pointe and Tétreaultville. It was previously annexed to Montreal in 1910, before Maisonneuve.

In 1960, the construction of the Autoroute 25 saw the demolition of many residential buildings in Mercier and divided it into two districts: Mercier-Ouest and Mercier-Est.

Starting in the 1980s, Hochelaga-Maisonneuve suffered significant economic and social decline, gaining a bad reputation for poverty, unemployment and organized crime.

In recent years Hochelaga-Maisonneuve, and to a much lesser extent Mercier, has experienced significant change and gentrification.

Geography

Located in the east end of the Island of Montreal, it was part of the City of Montreal prior to the 2002 municipal mergers. It is composed of the Hochelaga-Maisonneuve, Mercier-Ouest (Longue-Pointe) and Mercier-Est (Tétraultville) areas. Each area has roughly the same population, but they differ in their commercial and social characteristics.

The largely oblong borough is bordered to the west by Ville-Marie (Centre-Sud), northwest by the borough of Rosemont—La Petite-Patrie, on the northeast by Saint Leonard and Anjou, and to the east by Montréal-Est. To the south is the Saint Lawrence River.

Its main arteries running east to west are Rue Notre-Dame, Rue Sainte-Catherine Est, Rue Ontario, Rue Hochelaga, Avenue Pierre De Coubertin  and Rue Sherbrooke.

It has an area of 25,4 km² and the evolution of industry and transportation has profoundly transformed the borough.

Demographics

Employment
The borough is often cast in a negative light, mainly due to its economic planning and high poverty rate. However, it is often neglected to mention that the borough, despite a descriptive accent on its poverty, has large industrial zones and is commercially dynamic. It is often considered 'up and coming' with new revitalization plans for its residential zones.

According to 'Recensement des établissements et de l'emploi à Montréal (REEM 2000)' there's been an increase of 95% in professional and technical jobs in the borough. However, this can be attributed to gentrification in the area, specifically in the Hochelaga district.

The average family income in Mercier-Hochelaga-Maisonneuve is $48,544 and personal income of $29,919 are considerably below the Montreal average.
Nearly 19% of the borough's population is considered low-income, and there are patches of poverty scattered throughout the borough and heavily concentrated in the Hochelaga-Maisonneuve district.

Government

Borough council

Federal and provincial

The borough is divided among the following federal ridings:

Hochelaga
Honoré-Mercier
La Pointe-de-l'Île

It is divided among the following provincial electoral districts:

Hochelaga-Maisonneuve
Camille-Laurin
Anjou–Louis-Riel

Features
The borough is bisected by Autoroute 25 and contains the Montreal entrance to the Louis Hippolyte Lafontaine Tunnel. It is served by the eastern end of the green line of the Montreal metro; the Honoré-Beaugrand and Radisson stations are connected to important bus termini.

Attractions in the area include the Olympic Stadium, Saputo Stadium and Montreal Biodome, the Montreal Botanical Garden, the Château Dufresne, Collège de Maisonneuve, the Marché Maisonneuve, the Théâtre Denise-Pelletier, the Hôpital Maisonneuve-Rosemont, and the Place Versailles shopping centre located at the intersection of Rue Sherbrooke Est and Autoroute 25.

The Canadian Armed Forces also have a base, CFB Montreal, in the east of the borough.

The borough is home to the Church of Nativité-de-la-Sainte-Vierge-d'Hochelaga.

The Montreal Public Libraries Network operates the Hochelaga, Langelier, Maisonneuve, and Mercier libraries.

Education
The borough has one French language cégep, College de Maisonneuve.

The Commission scolaire de Montréal (CSDM) operates French-language public schools.

Elementary 
École Baril
École Notre-Dame-de-L'Assomption
École Maisonneuve
École Saint-Clément
École Saint-Jean-Baptiste-de-Lasalle
 École Notre-Dame-des-Victoires
 École Saint-Nom-de-Jésus
 École Louis Dupire
 École Saint-Fabien
 École Saint-Donat
 École Boucher-De La Bruère
 École Sainte-Louise-de-Marillac
 École Sainte-Claire
 École Saint-François-d'Assise
 École Saint-Justin
 École La Vérendrye
 École Irénée-Lussier
 École Armand-Lavergne
 École Philippe-Labarre

High school 
École Sécondaire Chomedey-De Maisonneuve
 École Sécondaire Marguerite-De Lajemmerais
 École Secondaire Édouard-Montpetit
 École Secondaire Académie Dunton
 École Sécondaire Louise-Trichet

Specialized 
École des Métiers de la Construction de Montréal
 École des Métiers de l'aérospatiale de Montréal
École pour Adultes Centre Hochelaga-Maisonneuve
École Eulalie-Durocher (for intellectually disabled)
 École de la Lancée (for boys with behavioural problems and in foster care)
The English Montreal School Board (EMSB) operates English-language schools.

Elementary 
 Edward Murphy Elementary School

High school 
(for high school, students must go to nearby Vincent Massey Collegiate in Rosemont)

Gallery

See also
Boroughs of Montreal
Districts of Montreal
Municipal reorganization in Quebec

References

La ville de Montreal, Arrondissement de Mercier-Hochelaga Maisonneuve: Plan strategic de developpement economique 2005-2008 (Plan D'action local pour l'economie et l'emploi) Le Groupe DBSF, Corporation de developpement de l'Est, May 2005

External links

Borough website (in French)
Historical buildings and picture of Hochelaga-Maisonneuve on IMTL.org

 
Boroughs of Montreal
Quebec populated places on the Saint Lawrence River
Gentrification in Canada